Acharya Prafulla Chandra Ray Polytechnic is a polytechnic college located in the city of Kolkata, West Bengal of India, alongside the campus of Jadavpur University. It is affiliated to the West Bengal State Council of Technical Education (WBSCTE), approved by All India Council For Technical Education (AICTE) and provides Diploma level technical education to its students.
The college is named after the scientist Acharya Prafulla Chandra Ray.There is no hostel facility.

Departments

Library & Centers
In the college there is a library. The students can issue trade wise text books for certain period of time. The library has also plenty of seating capacity for studying inside. Most of the text books of all departments are available in the library. The library is really very helpful for the needy students. Every student can issue two text books for every semester and can read any books inside the library.

Having a Students' Union responsible for various extra curricular activities like Fresher's Welcome, Annual Sports, Annual Cultural Programme etc.

External links
 Information on A.P.C. Ray Polytechnic
 Information on Acharya Prafulla Chandra Ray

References

Universities and colleges in Kolkata
Educational institutions established in 1962
Technical universities and colleges in West Bengal
1962 establishments in West Bengal